Arián Benjamín Pucheta (born 8 March 1995) is an Argentine professional footballer who plays as a centre-back for Orense.

Club career
Pucheta had a period of his youth career with Boca Juniors, prior to joining San Martín. He was promoted into San Martín's squad during the 2016–17 Argentine Primera División season, first appearing as an unused substitute for a 6–1 defeat to Newell's Old Boys on 18 December 2016. In the following March, Pucheta made his professional debut against Huracán at the Estadio San Juan del Bicentenario. Another three appearances occurred in 2016–17. He terminated his contract at the end of 2019, following thirty-six total appearances. In January 2020, Pucheta joined fellow Primera B Nacional team Ferro Carril Oeste.

Pucheta ended his Ferro contract in November 2020, having not appeared competitively for the club; due to the COVID-19 pandemic and minor injury. A move to Torneo Federal A with Central Norte soon followed, as the centre-back appeared five times before departing; notably receiving a red card in his final appearance on 3 January 2021 versus Atlético Güemes. Days later, on 7 January, Pucheta was announced as a new signing by Ecuadorian Serie A side Orense.

International career
Pucheta was selected for the 2011 South American Under-17 Football Championship by Argentina U17 manager Oscar Garré. He subsequently won six caps as Argentina finished third.

Career statistics
.

References

External links

1995 births
Living people
People from Formosa Province
Argentine footballers
Association football defenders
Argentine expatriate footballers
Expatriate footballers in Ecuador
Argentine expatriate sportspeople in Ecuador
Argentine Primera División players
Primera Nacional players
Torneo Federal A players
San Martín de San Juan footballers
Ferro Carril Oeste footballers
Central Norte players
Orense S.C. players